Alistair John "Ack" Soper (7 September 1936 – 16 June 2020) was a New Zealand rugby union player.

A number eight, Soper represented Southland at a provincial level, and was a member of the New Zealand national side, the All Blacks, on their 1957 tour of Australia. He played eight matches for the All Blacks on that tour, but did not appear in any internationals. He served as president of the Southland Rugby Union in 1985.

Soper played for the English club Blackheath in the 1960–61 season.

Soper died in Invercargill on 16 June 2020, aged 83.

References 

1936 births
2020 deaths
Rugby union players from Invercargill
People educated at Waitaki Boys' High School
New Zealand rugby union players
New Zealand international rugby union players
Southland rugby union players
Rugby union number eights
New Zealand sports executives and administrators
Blackheath F.C. players